Cora casanarensis is a species of basidiolichen in the family Hygrophoraceae. Found in Colombia, it was formally described as a new species in 2014 by Leidy Yasmín Vargas, Bibiana Moncada, and Robert Lücking. The lichen is only known to occur at the type locality, where it grows on rocks, often associated with bryophytes and with lichens from genus Hypotrachyna. The specific epithet refers to Casanare, the central eastern Colombian department that contains the type locality. Phylogenetically, the closest species to Cora casanarensis is C. strigosa, found in Peru.

References

casanarensis
Lichen species
Lichens described in 2014
Lichens of Colombia
Basidiolichens
Taxa named by Robert Lücking